Pius Sack (3 December 1865 – 5 February 1946) was a German entomologist who specialised in Diptera

His collection of World Diptera is conserved in Naturmuseum Senckenberg.

Works
partial list
1913. Die Gattung Merodon Meigen (Lampetia Meigen olim.). Abhandlungen des Senckenbergische Gesellschafts der Naturforscher 31: 427-462
1928 Die Ausbeute der deutschen Chaco-Expedition 4. Diptera Syrphidae / von P. Sack [Stuttgart] Württ. Naturaliensammlung 1928 in the series Mitteilungen aus dem Königlichen Naturalienkabinett zu Stuttgart, 128. 
1931 Syrphidae (Diptera) der Deutschen Limnologischen Sunda-Expedition.
1930 Zweiflügler, oder, Diptera. IV, Syrphidae-Conopidae / P. Sack, O. Kröber. Jena  G. Fischer, 1930.in the series Tierwelt Deutschlands und der angrenzenden Meeresteile nach ihren Merkmalen und nach ihrer Lebensweise, T. 20. 
1932 Syrphiden (Diptera) von den Kleinen Sunda-Inseln. (Ergebnisse der Sunda-Expedition Rensch.)

Several parts of Die Fliegen der paläarktischen Region (the Flies of the Palaearctic Region) edited by Erwin Lindner

References
Horn, W. 1936: [Sack, P.]  Arb. morph. taxon. Ent. Berlin-Dahlem, Berlin 3 (1)	63 (70 year birthday)

German entomologists
Dipterists
1865 births
1946 deaths